Anania subfumalis is a moth in the family Crambidae. It was described by Eugene G. Munroe and Akira Mutuura in 1971. It is found in Taiwan and Hunan, China.

Subspecies
Anania subfumalis subfumalis (Taiwan)
Anania subfumalis continentalis (Munroe & Mutuura, 1971) (China: Hunan)

References

Moths described in 1971
Pyraustinae
Moths of Asia
Moths of Taiwan